Albino Pighi (13 May 1903 - 15 October 1971) was an Italian shot putter. discus thrower and pentathlete who competed at the 1924 Summer Olympics.

National titles
He won twelve times the national championships at senior level.

Italian Athletics Championships
Shot put: 1924, 1925, 1926, 1928, 1930, 1932 (6)
Discus throw: 1924, 1925, 1926, 1928, 1930, 1931 (6)

References

External links
 

1903 births
1971 deaths
Sportspeople from Verona
Athletes (track and field) at the 1924 Summer Olympics
Athletes (track and field) at the 1928 Summer Olympics
Italian male shot putters
Italian male discus throwers
Italian male pentathletes
Olympic athletes of Italy
20th-century Italian people